Casas de Juan Núñez is a municipality in Albacete, Castile-La Mancha, Spain. It has a population of 1,372.

See also
Manchuela

References

External links 
 Ayuntamiento de Casas de Juan Núñez
 La Manchuela
 Página de Casas de Juan Núñez en el sitio web de la Diputación

Municipalities of the Province of Albacete